Russian Monarchist Party was a Russian monarchist right-wing nationalist organisation, founded in February 1905 in Moscow. In 1907 it changed name to Russian Monarchist Union. 

The party was founded by Vladimir A. Gringmut (ru), reactionary editor of the periodical Moscow News (Moskovskiye vedomosti), in February.

It advocated the reestablishment of a powerful autocratic rule, martial law, and suppression of Jews, who they claimed were mainly the instigators of the revolutionary disorders. It also stood for local self-government, public education, freedom of the press, improvement of workers and peasants conditions, and had following internal enemies: constitutional democrats, socialists, revolutionaries, anarchists and the aforementioned Jews, the Bundists.

References

Bibliography
 

Defunct nationalist parties in Russia
Monarchist organizations
Political parties in the Russian Empire
Russian nationalist organizations
Monarchism in Russia
1905 establishments in the Russian Empire
Organizations established in 1905
Anti-communist organizations
Monarchist parties in Russia